Sam Curry (born October 17, 1999) is an American bug bounty hunter, and founder. He is best known for his contributions to web application security through participation in bug bounty programs, most notably finding a security vulnerability in Tesla after cracking his windshield. Curry began working as a security consultant through his company 17security in 2018, and is currently a student at the University of Nebraska Omaha.

Curry has spoken on ethical hacking, web application security, and vulnerability disclosure at conferences including DEFCON, Black Hat Briefings, Kernelcon, and null. 2019, Curry identified a critical security vulnerability affecting various Jira products.

Biography 

Curry grew up in Omaha, Nebraska and attended Elkhorn High School. He began hacking at the age of 12, ethically disclosing vulnerabilities to various vendors over email. At University of Nebraska Omaha, Curry works with students through the cyber security club NULLify.

Publications and articles 

 "Researchers Secure Bug Bounty Payout to Help Raise Funds for Infant’s Surgery". vice.com. Retrieved June 2, 2021.
 "Pega Infinity hotfix released after researchers flag critical authentication bypass vulnerability" portswigger.net. Retrieved June 2, 2021.
 "We Hacked Apple for 3 Months: Here’s What We Found". samcurry.net. Retrieved April 9, 2021.
 "Filling in the Blanks: Exploiting Null Byte Buffer Overflow for a $40,000 Bounty". samcurry.net. Retrieved November 3, 2019.

References 

Hackers
1999 births
Living people
People from Omaha, Nebraska